ITA Award for Best Actor Jury is an award given by the Indian Television Academy as a part of its annual event.

Winners

2000s

2010s

See also 

 ITA Award for Best Actress Drama
 ITA Award for Best Serial – Drama

References 

TV awards for lead actor
Indian Television Academy Awards
Awards for male actors